Victor Zalazar (14 June 1933 – 30 June 2017) was an Argentine boxer, who won the bronze medal at the 1956 Summer Olympics in Melbourne, Australia. He was born in La Paz, Córdoba. Zalazar was known as "El Cacique", or "The Wild Bullet".

Olympic results 
Defeated Stig Sjölin (Sweden) points
Defeated Dieter Wemhöner (United Team of Germany) points
Lost to Gennadi Schatkov (Soviet Union) KO by 2

Professional career
Zalazar turned pro in 1957 and won his first 15 fights before taking on Benny Paret in 1958. He lost two straight decisions to Paret, and his career went downhill following the losses. He also lost, on points, to Dick Tiger.

External links

1933 births
2017 deaths
Olympic boxers of Argentina
Boxers at the 1956 Summer Olympics
Olympic bronze medalists for Argentina
Olympic medalists in boxing
Argentine male boxers
Medalists at the 1956 Summer Olympics
Middleweight boxers
People from San Javier Department, Santa Fe
Sportspeople from Santa Fe Province